Matheus Christiaan van Zyl, known as Ian van Zyl (born April 6, 1980 in Grootfontein, Otjozondjupa Region) , is a Namibian cricketer. He made his first-class debut for the Namibian team against Uganda in the 2005 ICC Intercontinental Cup. In the same competition the following year, he took 8-34 against Ireland, albeit in a losing cause. van Zyl also appeared in the 2005 ICC Trophy.

External links
 
 Statistical summary from CricketArchive

1980 births
White Namibian people
Namibian Afrikaner people
Namibian cricketers
Living people
People from Grootfontein